Grise Fiord is an Inuit hamlet on the southern tip of Ellesmere Island, in the Qikiqtaaluk Region, Nunavut, Canada. It is one of three populated places on the island; despite its low population (144 residents as of the 2021 Canadian census), it is the largest community (and only public community) on Ellesmere Island. The hamlet at Grise Fiord, created by the Canadian Government in 1953 through a relocation of Inuit families from Inukjuak, Quebec, is the northernmost public community in Canada.

History

Creation

This community (and that of Resolute) was created by the Canadian government in 1953, partly to assert sovereignty in the High Arctic during the Cold War. Eight Inuit families from Inukjuak, Quebec (on the Ungava Peninsula), were relocated after being promised homes and game to hunt, but the relocated people discovered no buildings and very little familiar wildlife. They were told that they would be returned home after a year if they wished, but this offer was later withdrawn, for it would have damaged Canada's claims to sovereignty in the area; the Inuit were forced to stay. Eventually, the Inuit learned the local beluga whale migration routes and were able to survive in the area, hunting over a range of  each year.

In 1993, the Canadian government held hearings to investigate the relocation program. The Royal Commission on Aboriginal Peoples issued a report entitled The High Arctic Relocation: A Report on the 1953–55 Relocation, recommending a settlement. The government paid CAD10 million to the survivors and their families, and gave a formal apology in 2010.

In 2009, artist and Grise Fiord resident Looty Pijamini was commissioned by Nunavut Tunngavik Incorporated to build a monument to commemorate the Inuit who sacrificed so much as a result of the Government's forced relocation programme of 1953 and 1955. Pijamini's monument, located in Grise Fiord, depicts a woman with a young boy and a husky, with the woman sombrely looking out towards Resolute Bay. Amagoalik's monument, located in Resolute, depicts a lone man looking towards Grise Fiord. This was meant to show separated families, and depicting them longing to see each other again. The Grise Fiord monument was unveiled by John Duncan, at the time, Minister of Aboriginal Affairs and Northern Development and Federal Interlocutor for Métis and Non-Status Indians, on September 10, 2010.

Grise Fiord was the location for a 1995 BBC documentary entitled Billy Connolly: A Scot in the Arctic, in which the comedian Billy Connolly camped alone for a week on the pack ice near to the community, armed with a rifle to protect him from polar bears.

Geography 

Located at the southern tip of Ellesmere Island, Grise Fiord is one of three permanent inhabited places on the island; further north on the island Environment Canada has a permanent weather station at Eureka, and at Alert there is a permanent Canadian Forces Base (CFS Alert) and weather station.

Grise Fiord is cradled by the Arctic Cordillera mountain range.

Demographics 

Community and fiord names
Just to the north of the community is the actual fiord, Grise Fiord. It means "pig inlet" in Norwegian. Otto Sverdrup from Norway named it so during an expedition around 1900 because he thought the walrus in the area sounded like pigs.

Living conditions

The houses are wooden and built on platforms to cope with the freezing and thawing of the permafrost. Hunting is still an important part of the lifestyle of the mostly Inuit population. Quota systems allow the villagers to supply many of their needs from populations of seals, walruses, narwhal and beluga whales, polar bears and muskox. Ecotourism is developing as people come to see the northern wildlife found on Ellesmere and surrounding islands.

Transportation
There are no connecting roads on Ellesmere Island, so Grise Fiord is connected to the rest of the world by a small airstrip (Grise Fiord Airport),  in length. Surrounded by mountains, it has one of the most difficult approaches for aircraft; it is cautioned that only very experienced pilots of Pilatus PC-12, DHC-6 Twin Otter, and DHC-7 aircraft attempt the approach.

For local travel needs, the villagers use all-terrain vehicles in the summer and snowmobiles in the winter. During the winter months travel is limited to the town site and a small patch of land to the east called Nuvuk due to mountains and ice fields that cut the town off from the rest of the island. Small boats are used in summer to reach hunting grounds, or hunting sea mammals on the ocean. Once a year large ships (sealift) arrive with supplies and fuel.

Economy, development, and sustainability
The local co-operative is the main place to purchase supplies. There are local guide and outfitting operations, which are an important source of income for many families. Carving, traditional clothing and other Inuit crafts are also important sources of income. Due to the extreme location, the economy is subsistence-based. Because of the potential for avalanches and falling rocks from mountains, there is no room for expansion.

Communications

In 1970, Bell Canada established what was then the world's most northerly telephone exchange (operated since 1992 by Northwestel). It is in the 867 area code (formerly 819 before October 1997) with its only exchange code of 980.

The community has been served by the Qiniq network since 2005. Qiniq is a fixed wireless service to homes and businesses, connecting to the outside world via a satellite backbone. The Qiniq network is designed and operated by SSI Micro. In 2017, the network was upgraded to 4G LTE technology, and 2G-GSM for mobile voice. In 2019, Bell Mobility became available to Grise Fiord.

Crime and safety
A Simon Fraser University study of Royal Canadian Mounted Police (RCMP) activity in the Baffin Region states that Grise Fiord had the lowest rate of criminal offences of all communities examined in 1992, and cites a 1994 Statistics Canada survey that gives the highest perception of personal safety.

Climate
Grise Fiord has a tundra climate (ET) with very short but cool summers and long, cold winters lasting almost the entire year.

See also
 List of municipalities in Nunavut
 Florin Fodor, a Romanian who was arrested trying to enter Canada illegally via Grise Fiord in September 2006.

References

External links

 Hamlet of Grise Fiord
 Grise Fiord Inuit Co-operative Limited
 Pictures from 2001–2006

Arctic Cordillera
Ellesmere Island
Populated places in Arctic Canada
Hamlets in the Qikiqtaaluk Region
Road-inaccessible communities of Nunavut